Dakhin Patti is a village in Baksha block in Jaunpur district, Varanasi division, Uttar Pradesh State, India. It is located 20km towards west from District head quarters Jaunpur. It is 1km from Baksha and 228km from State capital Lucknow.

Census(2011)

Dakhin Patti is a medium size village with total 146 families residing. The Dakhin Patti village has population of 1146 of which 563 are males while 583 are females as per Population Census 2011.
In Dakhin Patti village population of children with age 0-6 is 211 which makes up 18.41% of total population of village. Average Sex Ratio of Dakhin Patti village is 1036 which is higher than Uttar Pradesh state average of 912. Child Sex Ratio for the Dakhin Patti as per census is 918, higher than Uttar Pradesh average of 902.

Dakhin Patti village has higher literacy rate compared to Uttar Pradesh. In 2011, literacy rate of Dakhin Patti village was 68.34% compared to 67.68% of Uttar Pradesh. In Dakhin Patti male literacy stands at 78.59% while female literacy rate was 58.71%.

As per constitution of India and Panchyati Raaj Act, Dakhin Patti village is administrated by Sarpanch (Head of Village) who is elected representative of village.

Transportation

Rail

  Bakhsha Rail Way Station   2.9 KM      

   Harkhu Rail Way Station   3.5 KM      

   City Rail Way Station   17 KM    

   Junction Rail Way Station   19 KM

Air

 Varanasi Airport   58 KM     

 Bamrauli Airport   101 KM     

 Gorakhpur Airport   153 KM     

 Amausi Airport   219 KM 

Villages in Jaunpur district